Diego López may refer to:

Academics
Diego López de Zúñiga (theologian) (died 1531), Spanish Biblical scholar
Diego López de Cogolludo, Spanish Franciscan historian of Yucatán

Artists and entertainers
Diego López (painter) (c. 1465–1530), Spanish Renaissance painter
Diego López Rivera (born 1952), Mexican filmmaker

Politicians
Diego Lopez de Pacheco, 2nd Duke of Escalona (1456–1529), Spanish nobleman
Diego López de Zúñiga, 4th Count of Nieva (c. 1510–1564), viceroy of Peru, 1561–1564
Diego López Pacheco, 7th Duke of Escalona (1599–1653), Spanish nobleman
Diego López Garrido (born 1947), Spanish politician

Sportspeople

Association football
Diego López (footballer, born March 1974) (Diego Miguel López Santos), Spanish former midfielder
Diego López (footballer, born August 1974) (Luis Diego López Breijo), Uruguayan former defender and manager of Universidad de Chile
Diego López (Argentine footballer, born 1981) (Diego Martín López), former midfielder
Diego López (Spanish footballer, born 1981) (Diego López Rodríguez), goalkeeper for Rayo Vallecano	
Diego López (footballer, born 1983) (Diego López Aguilar), Mexican former defender and manager of Chihuahua
Diego López (footballer, born 1992) (Diego Fores López), Argentine defender for Estudiantes BA
Diego López (footballer, born 1994) (Diego Gastón López Barrios), Uruguayan midfielder for Llacuabamba	
Diego López (footballer, born 1995) (Diego Eduardo López), Paraguayan midfielder
Diego López (footballer, born 1996) (Diego Ignacio López), Argentine midfielder for Sportivo Las Parejas
Diego López (footballer, born 1999) (Diego López Reyes), Uruguayan defender for Sud América
Diego Lopez (soccer, born January 2002), American forward
Diego López (footballer, born May 2002) (Diego López Noguerol), Spanish forward for Valencia Mestalla

Other sports
Diego López (cyclist), Spanish cyclist
Diego López Díaz (born 1994), Mexican Paralympic swimmer

See also
Diego López de Haro (disambiguation)
Diego Jiménez López (born 1991), Spanish defender